Willis Davis may refer to:

Willis E. Davis (painter) (1855–1910), California landscape painter, father of the tennis champion
Willis E. Davis (tennis), American champion tennis player, son of the landscape painter
Willis Davis (Mississippi politician), state legislator in Mississippi (African-American officeholders during and following the Reconstruction era)''
Bing Davis (Willis Davis, born 1937), African American artist and educator